Lenka Háječková née Felbabová  (born 18 April 1978) is a Czech beach volleyball player. As of 2012, she plays with Hana Klapalová. They competed at the 2012 Summer Olympics in London.

She was part of the Czech Republic women's national volleyball team at the 2002 FIVB Volleyball Women's World Championship in Germany.

References 

1978 births
Czech beach volleyball players
Living people
Beach volleyball players at the 2012 Summer Olympics
Olympic beach volleyball players of the Czech Republic
Women's beach volleyball players
Sportspeople from Prague